The Mobira Talkman 450 is a brick phone which is discontinued.

References 

Nokia mobile phones